Pratapa icetas, the dark blue royal, is a species of lycaenid or blue butterfly found in Pakistan and India.

References 

Iolaini
Pratapa
Fauna of Pakistan
Butterflies of Asia
Butterflies described in 1865